Rosella was launched in 1819 at Newcastle upon Tyne. She sailed widely until she was wrecked in 1860.

Career
Rosella first appeared in Lloyd's Register (LR) in 1821.

On 3 April 1826 Rosella, Evans, master, arrived at Cowes, and at Gravesend on 16 April. She had left Sumatra on 24 September 1825 and the Cape on 31 December. She had arrived at the Cape on 16 December from Padang, having sustained damage.

On 16 August 1826 Rosella, Pyke, master, sailed for Bengal under a license from the EIC. Rosella, Tuke, master, arrived at Plymouth on 27 August, on her way to Bengal. On 29 August a survey on Rosella at Plymouth condemned her mainmast and two yards.

Unfortunately, there is no online Lloyd's List SAD data available after 1826. Although LR continued to show Rosella with trade London–Calcutta for some more years, there is no confirmation in the listing of licensed ships of any voyages after 1826.

On 6 October 1827, Rosella, Pyke, master, wrote a letter to her owners from Plymouth. On her way back from Bengal, Rosella had struck a hidden rock some two miles of the Bolt Head. There was so much damage to her rudder and wheel that Pyke was obliged to get a Cowes pilot boat to take her up to the Mewstone.

On 25 September 1828 Captain Gordon, master of Rosella, wrote from Monte Video that she had cleared customs, but that he did not expect that she would be able to sail upriver until 7 November when the blockade was expected to be lifted.

Fate
Rosella was last listed in LR in 1847 with stale data. 

One source, with continuous ownership data, reports that Rosella was lost on 24 August 1860 while carrying coal from South Shields to Rotterdam. It states that she sank off Egmond aan Zee, in the North Sea nine miles from Rotterdam.

Citations

References
 

1819 ships
Age of Sail merchant ships of England
Maritime incidents in August 1860